Kitsissut (old spelling Kitsigsut) is an island group in the Kujalleq municipality in southern Greenland.

Geography
It is a cluster of numerous small islets and rocks, with a length of less than 30 km and a width of 8 km, divided into two subgroups: Northern Kitsissut in the northwest and the smaller Southern Kitsissut in the southeast.  

Angissoq is the largest island, with a length of 3.7 km and a width of 3 km. It is also the highest island with a peak in its centre on which a beacon stands.

See also
List of islands of Greenland

References

Uninhabited islands of Greenland
Kujalleq